El Bolsón is a town in the southwest of Río Negro Province, Argentina, at the foot of the Piltriquitron Mountain. Due to a series of valleys through the mountains of Chile to the Pacific Ocean, El Bolsón has an unusually mild climate for its southern location.

El Bolsón area's first non-indigenous inhabitants were Chilean farmers Lucas Cárdenas  and Elcira Estrada, a couple who came in 1885 from San Pablo, near Osorno, and established themselves in the then known as "Valle Nuevo" (New Valley); in 2018 El Bolsón inaugurated the new Public Clock Square after the couple's names. In the 1970s hippies from Buenos Aires migrated to El Bolsón; some of them practised horticulture and made handcrafts.

El Bolsón has a tourism economy based on an outdoor artisan market, fly fishing, trekking, rafting, climbing, and other outdoor activities in the surrounding lakes and mountains. The nature tourism offers are complemented with the production of cheeses, smoked trout, special brew beer, regional chocolates and ice cream, as well as organic and wild-crafted jams and preserves, particularly elderberries.

Communication
El Bolsón is located approximately 120 km south of the major city of San Carlos de Bariloche and is served by El Bolsón Airport.

Climate
El Bolsón has a cool Mediterranean climate (Köppen climate classification Csb) owing to its rain shadow location. During cold waves, temperatures can occasionally fall below . During the winter months, precipitation is abundant (mostly rainfall and occasionally snowfalls), resulting in most days being overcast, averaging 15–17 overcast days per month from May to August. Spring and fall are transition seasons featuring warmer temperatures than in winter. Summers are warmer and sunnier with temperatures during the day averaging  in January and comparatively high diurnal ranges, with lows averaging . Frosts can even occur during the summer months.

History 
There have been many different inhabitants in the Bolsón region. However, the first settlers of the region were the tsonek. By custom they were hunters/gatherers and seasonally nomadic. It was normal for them to stay in the more sheltered regions of the forests and lakes during the winter and to hunt Guanaco more intensely during the summer and warm autumns. Very little is known about them before the sixteenth century, but through the process of Araucanization they were strongly influenced by the Mapuches. They were the most solid and cohesive culture around and were gaining ground toward eastern Patagonia, through both peaceful means and expansionist wars.

This town was not founded by any conqueror, Adelantado , explorer, or discoverer. This region simply served as a place of passage for the migrations of tsonek communities, transhumans looking for game, and gatherers for a long time. Afterwards, it was purely Mapuche territory. Later, with the first inroads of the Europeans in the region, it also provided temporary shelter to those who were carrying cattle and herdsmen crossing the cordillera in an east-west direction, and vice versa, from one sea coast to another. This, as well as Argentina's expansion into the region, resulted in frequent conflicts and disagreements with The Mapuche people.

The founding date of El Bolson is considered to be January 28, 1926. That day locals gathered at the home of Candido Azcona, resolving to create the first politically administrative organization in the region, and signing the charter, Commission for the Promotion of El Bolson . The elected members were: President Pedro Pascual Ponce: an Argentine born in the Province of San Luis. He was a teacher, informant ad honorem of the Ministry of Agriculture, rattle raiser, and took part in the Statistics and Census of the Nation of Argentina; Vice President Candido Azcona: a Spaniard from Basque Country, a farmer, and a merchant; Secretary Antonio Merino Rubio: a Spaniard from Malaga, a merchant, and a farmer; Treasurer José Ulieldin: a Lebanese merchant; pro-treasurer Miguel Anden: also a Lebanese merchant.

References

External links

Bolson, El
Ski areas and resorts in Argentina
Populated places established in 1902
German-Argentine culture
Cities in Argentina
Argentina
Río Negro Province